Marina Sciocchetti (born 13 November 1958) is an Italian equestrian.

Biography
Marina Sciocchetti won a team silver medal in eventing at the 1980 Summer Olympics in Moscow.

Olympic results

See also
Italy at the 1980 Summer Olympics

References

External links
 

1958 births
Living people
Equestrians at the 1980 Summer Olympics
Equestrians at the 1984 Summer Olympics
Olympic silver medalists for Italy
Olympic medalists in equestrian
Olympic equestrians of Italy
Italian female equestrians
Italian event riders
Medalists at the 1980 Summer Olympics